Corroded is a heavy metal band from Ånge, Sweden. The band is best known for their song Time And Again, which was the theme song for the Swedish 2009 Survivor television series on TV4. The band's second album Exit to Transfer, released in October 2010 by Ninetone Records, reached number 6 on the Swedish national record chart Sverigetopplistan. 
In 2013 Corroded played a European tour, supporting the Australian band Airbourne.

Corroded are musically inspired by Black Sabbath and Machine Head.

Band members

Current members
Jens Westin – vocals, rhythm guitar
Sam Söderlindh – lead guitar
Bjarne Elvsgård – bass
Per Soläng – drums

Former members
Niklas Källström – bass
Martin Källström – drums
Fredrik Westin – lead guitar
Tommy Rehn – lead guitar
Peter Sjödin – rhythm guitar
Tomas Andersson – lead guitar

Timeline

Discography

Studio albums

Singles

Video games
The band recorded the song "Age of Rage" for DICE's free online shooter, Battlefield Play4Free.

Their song "Come On In" was also featured in the soundtrack for the sports video game Major League Baseball 2K11.

References

External links
 Official website

Swedish musical groups
Swedish heavy metal musical groups
Swedish alternative metal musical groups
Swedish hard rock musical groups